Charles Aaron "Jack" West (March 13, 1890 – October 29, 1957) was an American football, Canadian football, and basketball coach and college athletics administrator.  He served as the head football coach at South Dakota State College of Agricultural and Mechanic Arts—now South Dakota State University—from 1919 to 1927 and at the University of North Dakota from 1928 to 1941 and again in 1945, compiling a career college football record of 134–55–14.  West was also the head basketball coach at South Dakota State from 1919 to 1926 and at North Dakota during the 1944–45 season, amassing a career college basketball record of 74–66.  He coached football teams to  11 North Central Conference titles, three at South Dakota State and eight at North Dakota.  In addition, he served as North Dakota's athletic director from 1928 to 1946.  West left the college ranks in 1946 to become head coach of the Winnipeg Blue Bombers, then of the Western Interprovincial Football Union, now a division of the Canadian Football League.  He died at the age of 67 on October 29, 1957 at his home in Grand Forks, North Dakota.

Head coaching record

College football

References

External links
 

1890 births
1957 deaths
Basketball coaches from Iowa
North Dakota Fighting Hawks athletic directors
North Dakota Fighting Hawks football coaches
North Dakota Fighting Hawks men's basketball coaches
People from Cherokee, Iowa
South Dakota State Jackrabbits athletic directors
South Dakota State Jackrabbits football coaches
South Dakota State Jackrabbits men's basketball coaches
Winnipeg Blue Bombers coaches